Denise Dowling Henderson (9 September 1929 – 6 September 1998) was an Australian freestyle swimmer. She competed in two events at the 1948 Summer Olympics.

Henderson was born in the Queensland town of Roma in 1929, and until the 2016 Summer Olympics in Rio de Janeiro was the only Olympic athlete from the town. In 1948, Roma Town Council named a street Spencer Street in her honour, being the location of the swimming baths where she learned to swim. In September 1950, she married stock manager and auctioneer George Henderson.

Henderson died on 6 September 1998 at John Flynn Hospital in Tugun on the Gold Coast.

References

External links
 

1929 births
1998 deaths
Australian female freestyle swimmers
Olympic swimmers of Australia
Swimmers at the 1948 Summer Olympics
Swimmers at the 1950 British Empire Games
People from Roma, Queensland
Commonwealth Games medallists in swimming
Commonwealth Games gold medallists for Australia
Medallists at the 1950 British Empire Games